Eskişehir (from  "old" and  "city") is a city in northwestern Turkey and the capital of the Eskişehir Province. The urban population of the city is 898,369 with a metropolitan population of 797,708. The city is located on the banks of the Porsuk River, 792 m above sea level, where it overlooks the fertile Phrygian Valley. In the nearby hills one can find hot springs. It is located in the vicinity of the ancient city of Dorylaeum. Known as a university town; Eskişehir Technical University, Eskişehir Osmangazi University, and Anadolu University are based in Eskişehir.

Etymology
The name  can be literally translated as 'Old City' in Turkish. The name has been documented in Ottoman records since the late 15th century.

History 

The city was founded by the Phrygians in at least 1000 BC, although it has been estimated to be older than 4000 years old. The current city lies about a mile from the ancient Phrygian city of Dorylaeum. Many Phrygian artifacts and sculptures can still be found in the city's archeological museum. There is also a museum of meerschaum stone, whose production remains still notable, used to make high quality meerschaum pipes. In the fourth century AD the city moved about ten km northeast, from Karacahisar to Şehirhöyük. The region was originally inhabited by Hittites.

Many ancient geographers described the city as one of the most beautiful in Anatolia.

As with many towns in Anatolia, Christianity arrived after Constantine the Great legalized the religion in the Roman Empire. Beginning in the 4th century, records exist of bishops holding office in Eskişehir. One of these bishops, Eusebius, was heavily involved in shaping the evolving dogma of the church.

It was called  during the Seljuk period. In 1097 it was the site of a battle of the First Crusade in which the Crusaders defeated the Seljuk Turkish sultan Kilij Arslan I; the town later fell to the Turks in 1176, or the 13th century. From 1867 until 1922, Eskişehir was part of Hüdavendigâr vilayet.

Geography 
The city of Eskişehir is sited on the banks of Porsuk River, which flows into the Sakarya River. Porsuk Dam, located near the Eskişehir-Kütahya border controls the flow of the water in the river.

Climate 
Eskişehir has a cold semi-arid climate (BSk) under the Köppen climate classification, and a temperate continental climate (Dc) under the Trewartha climate classification. The city features cold, snowy winters and warm, dry summers. Rainfall occurs mostly during the spring and autumn. Due to Eskişehir's high altitude and its dry summers, nightly temperatures in the summer months are cool. Precipitation levels are low, but precipitation can be observed throughout the year.

Economy
Traditionally dependent on flour milling and brickyards, the city expanded with the building of railway workshops in 1894 for work on the Berlin–Baghdad railway. 

As of 1920, Eskişehir was one of the major locations for meerschaum mining. At that time, most of the mining sites were owned by the state.

Devrim, the first Turkish automobile, was produced in 1961 at the TÜLOMSAŞ factory in Eskişehir. Devrim never put into mass production and stayed a concept study and can be viewed in TÜLOMSAŞ factory Eskişehir. In addition to production, first Turkish steam powered locomotive called Karakurt was produced at the TÜLOMSAŞ in 1961.
Eskişehir was also the site of Turkey's first aviation industry (Aeronautical Supply Maintenance Centre) and its air base was the command center of Turkey's first Tactical Air Force headquarters on NATO's southern flank during the Cold War.

Eskişehir produces trucks, home appliances, railway locomotives, fighter aircraft engines, agricultural equipment, textiles, brick, cement, chemicals, processed meerschaum and refined sugar. , one of Turkey's largest food brands (mostly producing biscuit, chocolate and candy varieties) is based in Eskişehir. Arçelik, a major Turkish home appliances and consumer electronics manufacturer, has one of its production plants in Eskişehir. Eskişehir was the first stage of High-speed rail in Turkey from Ankara. This service improved the travel and commerce between Eskişehir and Ankara, thanks to reduced journey time. GKN, a major global automotive supplier for passenger and commercial car powertrain systems has a plant in Eskişehir.

The city is served by the Anadolu Airport.

Education

There are three universities in Eskişehir. These are the Anadolu University, Eskişehir Osmangazi University, and the Eskişehir Technical University which is the first university in the world that gained the privilege of managing airports. Anadolu University, in addition to its on-campus studies, started open university courses through TV broadcasts in the 1980s. Allowing access to tertiary education for thousands of students who otherwise would not have been able to benefit from any. The current Metropolitan Mayor of Eskişehir, Prof. Dr. Yılmaz Büyükerşen, was formerly the rector of the Anadolu University.

Culture
The city has a significant population of Turkic Crimean Tatars. It also attracted ethnic Turks emigrating from Balkan countries such as Bulgaria, Romania, Bosnia, North Macedonia and the Sandžak region of Serbia, who contributed to the development of the city's metalworking industries.
Eskişehir also hosted the inaugural Turkvision Song Contest in 2013, which aims to highlight music and artists from various Turkic-speaking regions. The city is also home to the Dünya Müzeleri Müzesi or Museum of World Museums.

Other museums in the city are Eti Archaeology Museum, Aviation Museum, Meerschaum Museum, Museum of Independence, Museum of Modern Glass Art, Tayfun Talipoğlu Typewriter Museum, Yılmaz Büyükerşen Wax Museum and the Odunpazarı Modern Museum.

Attractions

Most of modern-day Eskişehir was rebuilt after the Turkish War of Independence (1919–1923), but a number of historic buildings remain, such as the Kurşunlu Mosque. The archaeological site of the ancient Phrygian city of Dorylaeum is close to Eskişehir. The city is noted for its natural hot sulphur springs.

Sports

Association football club Eskişehirspor, founded in 1965, plays in the TFF Second League after being relegated during the 2021-22 TFF First League. It plays its home games in the New Eskişehir Stadium.

Notable natives
 Eusebius of Dorylaeum5th century bishop
 Battal Gazi8th century Muslim saint buried in Seyitgazi
 Yunus Emre13th century Turkish folk poet
 Sheik Edebali13th century religious leader, spiritual founder of the Ottoman Empire
 Behiç Erkin - Turkish Schindler, first director (1920–1926) of the Turkish State Railways, Minister of Public Works (1926–1928), Turkish Ambassador (Budapest 1928–1939, Paris and Vichy 1939-1943)
 Yakup Satar - last Turkish veteran of the First World War
 Fahrettin Kerim Gökay - Professor, former Mayor of Istanbul (1949–1957), former Turkish Ambassador (Bern), former Minister of State
 Yılmaz Büyükerşen - Professor, Metropolitan Mayor of Eskişehir, Reporter, Columnist, Caricaturist, Editor, former Rector of Anadolu University, former member of RTYK, Professional Wax Sculptor
 Cüneyt Arkın - Actor, Director, Producer, Martial Artist, Doctor in Medicine
 Nuri Alço - Actor, Director, Producer
 Eqrem Çabej - Linguist and scholar 
 Melis Birkan - Actress
 Zeki Sezer - former Leader of the Democratic Left Party DSP, Chemical Engineer, Minister of State (57th government)
 Hasan Polatkan - Politician
 Mehmet Terzi - Long-Distance Runner
 Gamze Bulut -  Mid-Distance Runner
 Zeki Önder Özen - Football Manager
 Ömer Çatkıç - Football Goalkeeper
 Neslihan Demir Darnel - Volleyball Player
 İpek Şenoğlu - Tennis Player
 Ersan İlyasova - Basketball Player
 Kerem Gönlüm - Basketball Player
 Ceyhun Yıldızoğlu - Basketball Coach 
 Asya (singer) - Pop Singer, Song-Writer
 Tuna Kiremitçi - Author, Poet, Columnist, Composer
 Enis Batur - Author, Lecturer
 Alper Erturk - Professor at Georgia Institute of Technology
 Gürer Aykal - Conductor, Adjunct Professor at Bilkent University
 Banu Avar - Writer and journalist
 Mete Erpek (Joker) - Rapper

Non-natives
Fikri Cantürk, Professor of Painting, Anadolu University

International relations

Twin towns — sister cities
Eskişehir is twinned with:

 Changzhou, China
 Frankfurt am Main, Germany
 Kazan, Russia
 Kyrenia, Northern Cyprus
 Linz, Austria
 Paju, South Korea
 Saint-Josse-ten-Noode, Belgium

See also

Notes

References

External links

 District governor's official website 
 District municipality's official website 
 Eskişehir Police Headquarters 
 Eskişehir News 
 Eskişehirspor Sports Club
 

 
Cities in Turkey
Ancient Greek archaeological sites in Turkey